Adil Garh is a village inhabited mostly by Cheema. The village is also known for a famous person, Master.M.Nawaz Cheema . He was also a member of the district Teachers council. He has the most agriculture land. The village is located near the Safdarabad tehsil of Sheikhupura district, Punjab, Pakistan. The village is one of the developed ones in the vicinity. It has a government hospital (B.H.U.), government high schools for boys as well as government middle girls school and access to all basic utilities apart from natural gas. The whole village is developed. There is a beautiful mosque named Jamia Masjid Gulzar-e-Madina in the middle of the village. Nomi and Chacho karyana store is oldest shop of the village. There is a private college for girls named Bright Future Public College.

External links

Villages in Gujranwala District